The Financial Supervisory Authority of Norway is a Norwegian government agency responsible for supervision of financial companies within Norway based on law and regulations from Storting, the Norwegian Ministry of Finance and international accounting standards. The agency is located in Oslo and is under the supervision of the Ministry of Finance.

History
It was established in 1986 through a merger  of the Bank Inspection Agency, the Broker Control Agency and the Norwegian Insurance Council.

Primary companies supervised by the authority are banks, insurance companies, credit companies, financing companies, pension funds, security companies, stock exchanges, security registries, real estate agencies, debt collection agencies, accountants and auditors.

See also
Securities Commission

References

External links
Official Website

Government agencies of Norway
Norway
Government agencies established in 1986
1986 establishments in Norway
Finance in Norway
Regulation in Norway